Nicole Arumugam is a British actress. She is half Irish, half Malaysian.

She is best known for appearing on British television, most notably the BBC soap opera EastEnders, where she played Michelle Fowler's college friend and flatmate Shelley Lewis from 1992 to 1994.

Other television credits include Is It Legal? (1995–1996); Harbour Lights (2000); Doctors, where she played Kali Hamanda from 2001 to 2002; and Murder in Mind (2003). She has also contributed to a number of programmes for the BBC's Look and Read (1998), a long-running children's educational programme aimed at 7-9-year-olds.

References

External links 
 

British film actresses
British soap opera actresses
Living people
British actresses of Asian descent
British people of Malaysian descent
British people of Irish descent
Malaysian people of Indian descent
Year of birth missing (living people)
20th-century British actresses
21st-century British actresses